Indiana Family Institute (IFI) is a non-profit lobbying organization in Indiana, United States. Curt Smith is the organization's president. The organization gained national attention for its role in the passing of Indiana's Religious Freedom Restoration Act in 2015. IFI is affiliated with Focus on the Family and Alliance Defending Freedom.

References

1994 establishments in Indiana
Non-profit organizations based in Indianapolis